The Frank E. Heller Dam is an embankment dam that impounds Hagerman's Run and creates the Hagerman Reservoir that supplies water for Lycoming County, Pennsylvania. It is owned by the Williamsport Municipal Water Authority and Pennsylvania-American Water Company. Opened in 1975 it is located in Armstrong Township in southern Lycoming County.

History 
Construction of the dam began in 1972 and was completed in 1975. With population of Williamsport and the county rising the Williamsport Municipal Water Authority was in need of expansion. The expansion added 530 million gallons to the storage capacity.

Danger of breach 
In August 2019 engineers found signs of fatigue in the dams base and had failed its inspection. A water authority spokesperson said the dam is "highly likely to have a complete failure in the next five to ten years". Its estimated over 2,600 people as well as hundreds of homes and businesses would be at risk if the dam were to fail. Economic costs are could to be at over $22 million. The Williamsport Municipal Water Authority has submitted an emergency grant request of $221,357 in preliminary engineering funds to the Federal Emergency Management Agency and hopes to receive approval by Sept. 30.

References 

Dams in Pennsylvania
Bodies of water of Lycoming County, Pennsylvania
1975 establishments in Pennsylvania
Embankment dams
Dams completed in 1975